Anthony Wayne Ishii (born September 19, 1946) is a senior United States district judge of the United States District Court for the Eastern District of California.

Early life and education
Born in Santa Ana, California, Ishii received an Associate of Science degree from Reedley Junior College in 1966, a Doctor of Pharmacy from the University of the Pacific School of Pharmacy in 1970, and a Juris Doctor from the University of California, Berkeley, Boalt Hall School of Law in 1973.

Career
He was a deputy in the City Attorney's Office of Sacramento, California in 1975, and a deputy public defender, Public Defender's Office, County of Fresno, California in 1979. He was in private practice in Fresno, California from 1979 to 1983. He was a Justice Court judge, Parlier-Selma Judicial District, County of Fresno, California from 1983 to 1993, and a Municipal Court judge, Central Valley Municipal Court, County of Fresno, California from 1994 to 1997.

Federal judicial service
On February 12, 1997, Ishii was nominated by President Bill Clinton to a seat on the United States District Court for the Eastern District of California vacated by Robert E. Coyle. Ishii was confirmed by the United States Senate on October 9, 1997, and received his commission on October 14, 1997, becoming the first Asian Pacific American judge on the United States District Court for the Eastern District of California. He served as chief judge from 2008 to 2012. He took senior status on October 31, 2012.

Awards and recognition
In 2013 Ishii received the President’s Award from the Asian/Pacific Bar Association of Sacramento.

See also
List of Asian American jurists

References

Sources

1946 births
Living people
California state court judges
Judges of the United States District Court for the Eastern District of California
United States district court judges appointed by Bill Clinton
American jurists of Japanese descent
University of the Pacific (United States) alumni
UC Berkeley School of Law alumni
Public defenders
People from Santa Ana, California
Reedley College alumni
20th-century American judges
21st-century American judges